Sadovoye is a rural locality (a selo) and the administrative center of Sadovskoye Rural Settlement of Krasnogvardeysky District, Adygea, Russia. The population was 1422 as of 2018. There are 15 streets.

Geography 
Sadovoye is located 20 km southeast of Krasnogvardeyskoye (the district's administrative centre) by road. Bzhedugkhabl is the nearest rural locality.

Ethnicity 
The village is inhabited by Russians and Kurds according to the 2010 census.

References 

Rural localities in Krasnogvardeysky District

Kurdish settlements